Vandervell v Inland Revenue Commissioners [1967] 2 AC 291 is a leading English trusts law case, concerning resulting trusts. It demonstrates that the mere intention to not have a resulting trust (for example, to avoid taxes) does not make it so.

This case was the first in a series of decisions involving Tony Vandervell's trusts and his tax liability. It concerned whether an oral instruction to transfer an equitable interest in shares complied with the writing requirement under Law of Property Act 1925, section 53(1)(c), and so whether receipt of dividends was subject to tax. The second was Re Vandervell Trustees Ltd, which involved the Special Commissioner of the Inland Revenue's ability to amend tax assessments. The third was Re Vandervell Trustees Ltd (No 2), which concerned whether Vandervell could be taxed because he could have an equitable interest through a resulting trust if he had exercised an option right.

Facts
Tony Vandervell was a wealthy racing car manufacturer with a company called Vandervell Products Ltd. He wanted to donate to the Royal College of Surgeons, to establish a chair of pharmacology. He also wanted to avoid paying tax on the donation. At the time, stamp duty applied to outright donations and taxes applied to any income through dividends on company shares. However, since the Royal College of Surgeons was a charity it was not liable to pay tax on any income.

Vandervell orally instructed his trust company (Vandervell Trustees Ltd, which was also set up to administer his money for his children) to transfer 100,000 shares in Vandervell Products Ltd to the Royal College of Surgeons, with an option for the trustees to purchase the shares back for £5000. He then instructed the company to declare a dividend on the shares. So while the shares were in the possession of the Royal College of Surgeons, it paid out £245,000 in dividends up to 1961. Vandervell had hoped this would mean that he would avoid tax (as opposed to simply getting income for himself, on which he would pay tax, and then giving the money to the College). Unfortunately, in 1960, the Inland Revenue made a claim for tax on the transfer.

The Inland Revenue argued that Vandervell retained an equitable interest in the shares. They were still his, as even though the shares were possessed by the College, he had the option to get them back. They also argued his oral instruction to the trust company was not capable of transferring the equitable interest, because it did not comply with the formality requirements specified in Law of Property Act 1925 section 53(1)(c). This section requires signed writing to evidence the existence of a disposition. So he should be liable to pay tax on the value of those shares.

Judgment
The House of Lords, by three to two, found that Vandervell was indeed liable to pay tax on the £245,000 of dividends given to the Royal College of Surgeons. The House of Lords held that the Law of Property Act 1925, section 53(1)(c), was not applicable to situations where a beneficiary directs his trustees, by way of his Saunders v Vautier right to do so, to transfer full legal and equitable ownership to someone else. The case is a proposition that an oral declaration to a bare trustee to transfer the trust property to a third party absolutely for his own benefit is a valid disposition. However, Vandervell had not successfully divested himself of ownership (legal and equitable) in the shares, since the Trust Company had an option to purchase the shares back from the RCS. If the settlor does not divest himself adequately as in Vandervell v IRC a resulting trust would operate. The option to purchase a substantial fraction of the company for only £5000 was extremely valuable. As such, Vandervell was liable to pay surtax on the option.

Lord Wilberforce said that there was,

See also
English trusts law
Resulting trusts in English law
Re Vandervell's Trusts (No 2) [1974] Ch 269
Tinsley v Milligan  [1994]  1  AC 340 
Tribe v Tribe  [1996]  Ch 107 
Westdeutsche Landesbank Girozentrale v Islington London Borough Council  [1996]  AC 669
Air Jamaica Ltd v Charlton [1999]  1 WLR  1399  
Barclays Bank Ltd v Quistclose Investments Ltd  [1970]  AC 567 
Twinsectra Ltd v Yardley [2002]  2 AC 164

Notes

References
RC Nolan, ‘Vandervell v IRC: A Case of Overreaching’ [2002] CLJ 169, argued that a trustee should not have to take instructions from a beneficiary with a limited interest in shares, because that would be contrary to the principle that a registered owner should vote in the interests of all beneficiaries.

English trusts case law
House of Lords cases
1966 in law
1966 in British law
HM Revenue and Customs
United Kingdom taxation case law